The 1987–88 Wichita State Shockers men's basketball team represented Wichita State University in the 1987–88 NCAA Division I men's basketball season. They played their home games at the University of Wichita Field House. They were in their 43rd season as a member of the Missouri Valley Conference and 82nd season overall. They were led by head coach Eddie Fogler in his 2nd season at the school. They finished the season 20–10, 11–3 in Missouri Valley play to finish in second place. They lost in the semifinals of the MVC tournament, but received an at-large bid to the 1988 NCAA tournament. As the No. 12 seed in the Midwest region, the Shockers lost in the opening round to DePaul, 83–62.

Roster

Schedule and results

|-
!colspan=12 style=""| Regular season

|-
!colspan=9 style=|MVC tournament

|-
!colspan=9 style="" | NCAA tournament

References

Wichita State Shockers men's basketball seasons
Wichita State
Wichita State
Shock
Shock